These are the candidates for the 2013 Philippine House of Representatives elections, by party. For independent candidates, see Independent candidates in the Philippine House of Representatives elections, 2013. For party-list nominees, see Party-list nominees in the Philippine House of Representatives election, 2013. For candidates per district, refer to the elections by district articles.

Akyson Demokratiko

Ang Kapatiran

Kilusang Bagong Lipunan

Laban ng Demokratikong Pilipino

Lakas-Christian Muslim Democrats

Liberal Party
*as Akbayan party-list representative

Nacionalista Party

National Unity Party

Nationalist People's Coalition

Partido Demokratiko Pilipino-Lakas ng Bayan

Partido ng Magsasaka at Manggagawa

Pwersa ng Masang Pilipino

United Nationalist Alliance

Other and local parties
Included here are parties that put up candidates in less than four districts, and local parties. This does not include local parties that had co-nominated a candidate from a national, or another, party already listed above.

Independents

Party-list

References

2013 Philippine general election